Yacine Saandi (born 2 April 1987 in Marseille, France) is a French-born Comorian footballer who has played 2 matches for the Comoros national football team.

Career
Saandi has played amateur football for French sides US Marignane, and RCO Agde. He was tested at Nîmes Olympique in July 2011 but was not kept. Then he joined the Club Deportivo Cordillero (Spain) in the 3rd Spanish division (Asturias).
In July 2012, he was tested with the Grenoble Foot 38 but not kept.

References

External links

Profile at Foot-National
Profile at GF38-Historique

French footballers
Comorian footballers
Comoros international footballers
French sportspeople of Comorian descent
Footballers from Marseille
1987 births
Living people
Marignane Gignac Côte Bleue FC players
Association football midfielders